National Hero of Armenia is the highest title in Armenia. The law on the title was signed by President Levon Ter-Petrosyan on 22 April 1994. It is awarded "for outstanding services of national importance to the Republic of Armenia in defense and strengthening of the state system and creation of important national values." Along with the title, its recipients receive the Order of Fatherland.  It was created as the Armenian successor to the Hero of the Soviet Union award, which was abolished upon independence of Armenia.

The first recipient of the title was Catholicos Vazgen I, the head of the Armenian church, who received it on 28 July 1994.

Recipients
This is a table of persons who were awarded the 'National Hero of Armenia':

See also
Orders, decorations, and medals of Armenia

References

External links 
 State awards of the Republic of Armenia

 
1994 establishments in Armenia
Awards established in 1994
Hero (title)
Orders, decorations, and medals of Armenia